The knockout stage of the 2011 AFC Asian Cup started on 21 January and ended on 29 January 2011. The top two placed teams from each preliminary group advanced to this stage.

Qualified teams

Bracket

Match details

Quarter-finals

Japan vs Qatar

Uzbekistan vs Jordan

Australia vs Iraq

Iran vs South Korea

Semi-finals

Japan vs South Korea

Uzbekistan vs Australia

Third place match

Final

References

External links
AFC Asian Cup 2011 Official Site

Knock
Australia at the 2011 AFC Asian Cup
Japan at the 2011 AFC Asian Cup
2011 in Uzbekistani football
2011 in South Korean football
2010–11 in Iranian football
2010–11 in Qatari football
2010–11 in Iraqi football
2010–11 in Jordanian football